Parkers Prairie can refer to a community in the United States:

 Parkers Prairie, Minnesota
 Parkers Prairie Township, Otter Tail County, Minnesota